Visa requirements for Laotian citizens are administrative entry restrictions by the authorities of other states placed on citizens of the Laos. As of 28 September 2019, Laotian citizens had visa-free or visa on arrival access to 49 countries and territories, ranking the Laotian passport 92nd in terms of travel freedom (tied with the passports of Angola, Cameroon, Egypt, Haiti & Jordan) according to the Henley Passport Index. Lao people is also a part of ASEAN and has visa-free access to these countries and vice versa.

Visa requirements map

Visa requirements

See also

 Visa policy of Laos
 Laotian passport

References and Notes
References

Notes

Laos
Foreign relations of Laos